Watson Lake Water Aerodrome  is located  west of Watson Lake, Yukon, Canada.

See also
Watson Lake Airport

References

Registered aerodromes in Yukon
Seaplane bases in Yukon